Campbell's Island State Memorial is a granite monument that marks the site of a day-long battle on July 19, 1814 during the War of 1812 on Campbell's Island, Illinois.  Dedicated in 1908, the monument is maintained by the Illinois Historic Preservation Agency as a national historic site.

References

External links
 Campbell's Island State Memorial

Illinois State Historic Sites
Monuments and memorials in Illinois
Buildings and structures in Rock Island County, Illinois
Tourist attractions in Rock Island County, Illinois
1908 sculptures
Granite sculptures in Illinois